Chōei or Choei (written: 長英 or 栄) is a masculine Japanese given name. Notable people with the name include:

 (born 1951), Japanese footballer
 (1804–1850), Japanese scholar

Japanese masculine given names